= Aralikatti =

Coordinates: 14°35′N 75°27′E

- Village
- Interactive map of Aralikatti
- Country: India
- State: Karnataka
- District: Belgaum
- Taluka: Belagavi

Languages
  - Official: Kannada
- Time zone: UTC+5:30 (IST)

Aralikatti is a village in Belagavi district in the southern state of Karnataka, India.
